The National Association of Private Special Education Centers is a non-profit association that represents private special education centers and their leaders.  The group promotes programs for individuals with disabilities and their families and advocates for access to alternative placements and services. It is the parent organization of the National Commission for the Accreditation of Special Education Services.

Members include:
Hawkswood School, Eatontown, New Jersey
Brehm Preparatory School, Carbondale, Illinois
Brookfield Schools, Cherry Hill, New Jersey

References

External links 
 www.napsec.org

Professional associations based in the United States